Sean Duke (born May 7, 1988) is a Canadian rugby union player who has competed for the Canadian national team since 2008.

Education
After studying for two years at Queen's University, he transferred to the University of Victoria to complete his BSc in Kinesiology after 4 additional years due to rugby commitments. He completed his MSc in Kinesiology at the University of Victoria in two and a half years also due to rugby commitments. He retired from rugby in late 2016 due to a back injury and due to beginning studies for an MD at the University of British Columbia, but was later invited to play for a Canadian test series in June 2017.

References

1988 births
Living people
Canada international rugby sevens players
Canadian rugby union players
Rugby sevens players at the 2015 Pan American Games
Sportspeople from Vancouver
Pan American Games medalists in rugby sevens
Pan American Games gold medalists for Canada
Rugby sevens players at the 2014 Commonwealth Games
Commonwealth Games rugby sevens players of Canada
Rugby sevens players at the 2010 Commonwealth Games
Canada international rugby union players
Rugby sevens players at the 2019 Pan American Games
Medalists at the 2015 Pan American Games
Medalists at the 2019 Pan American Games